The 1908 Cork Senior Hurling Championship was the 21st staging of the Cork Senior Hurling Championship since its establishment by the Cork County Board in 1887.

Dungourney were the defending champions.

Blackrock won the championship following a 4-11 to 2-3 defeat of Midleton in the final. This was their 10th championship title overall and their first title in five championship seasons.

Results

Semi-finals

Final

Miscellaneous

 Midleton qualify for the final for the first time.

References

Cork Senior Hurling Championship
Cork Senior Hurling Championship